The Grande Rivière (in English: Grand River) is a tributary of the Ouelle River which flows on the south shore of the St. Lawrence River, in the province of Quebec, in Canada.

The Grande Rivière flows successively in the regional county municipalities (MRC) of:
 L'Islet Regional County Municipality (administrative region of Chaudière-Appalaches): municipalities of Sainte-Perpétue, Tourville and Saint-Damase-de-L'Islet;
 Kamouraska Regional County Municipality (administrative region of Bas-Saint-Laurent): municipalities of Saint-Onésime-d'Ixworth and Saint-Gabriel-Lalemant.

Geography 
The Grande Rivière has its source at Fournier Lake which is located in the municipality of Sainte-Perpétue in the heart of the Notre Dame Mountains.

Upper part of the Grande Rivière (segment of )

  north in Sainte-Perpétue, up to the limit of Tourville;
  northward, into Tourville;
  northeasterly in Sainte-Perpétue, to the limit of Tourville;
  north in Tourville, to the limit between Saint-Damase-de-L'Islet; at the very end of this segment, the Grande Rivière collects water from the rivière du Rat Musqué (coming from the south);
  northward, to the confluence of the Sainte-Anne River;

Lower part of the Grande Rivière (segment of )

  north, up to the road bridge;
  northward, to the confluence of the Chaude River;
  northward in Saint-Onésime-d'Ixworth, up to the limit of Saint-Gabriel-Lalemant;
  westward, forming a northward loop in Saint-Gabriel-Lalemant, to its confluence.

The confluence of the river is located in the municipality of Saint-Gabriel-Lalemant, very close to the limit of Saint-Onésime-d'Ixworth.

The Grande Rivière is canoeable.

Toponymy 
The toponym La Grande Rivière was made official on December 5, 1968, by the Commission de toponymie du Québec.

See also 

 List of rivers of Quebec

References 

Rivers of Chaudière-Appalaches
Rivers of Bas-Saint-Laurent
Kamouraska Regional County Municipality
L'Islet Regional County Municipality